Cleavant Derricks Jr. (born May 15, 1953) is an American actor and Tony Award winning singer-songwriter, who is best known for his role of Rembrandt Brown on Sliders.

Biography
Derricks was born in Knoxville, Tennessee to a pianist mother Cecile G. and Baptist preacher/composer Cleavant Derricks Sr., famous for his popular gospel music hymn Just a Little Talk with Jesus. His twin brother is actor and musician Clinton Derricks-Carroll. Derricks began his career as a Nashville gospel songwriter. With his father, he wrote the gospel album Satisfaction Guaranteed. He was the musical director and composer for the musical When Hell Freezes Over I'll Skate.

Derricks went to New York City to study acting with Vinnette Carroll at the Urban Arts Theatre. He received rave reviews for his performance in his Broadway shows, including But Never Jam Today. He also won a Tony Award and Drama Desk Award for creating the role of James "Thunder" Early in Dreamgirls. Off-Broadway he was in the William Finn musical Romance in Hard Times in 1989. He also starred in the Broadway musical Brooklyn as the Streetsinger.

Soon afterwards, Derricks appeared in films such as Moscow on the Hudson, Neil Simon's The Slugger's Wife and recently, Wes Craven's Carnival of Souls. He was a series regular on the short-lived television series Thea with Thea Vidale and Brandy, and Good Sports with Farrah Fawcett and Ryan O'Neal. His role as Rembrandt Brown on Sliders with Jerry O'Connell, Sabrina Lloyd and John Rhys-Davies was the only Sliders character to appear throughout the entire series. In addition, Derricks has had numerous guest-starring roles in series such as Roseanne, A Different World, Miami Vice, Spenser: For Hire, Charmed, and many others.

In 2019, Derricks took over the role of the Wizard of Oz in the 2nd U.S. tour of Wicked.

Filmography

 Miami Magma (2011) as Ray Jackson
 Rome & Jewel (2008) as Reverend Q
 Cold Case (2007)
 The Wedding Bells (2007)
 Basilisk: The Serpent King (2006) as Col. Douglas
 The Bernie Mac Show (2002) as Willie
 World Traveler (2001) as Carl
 The Practice (2001) as Mr. Lees
 18 Wheels of Justice (2000) as Harold Baines
 Charmed (2000) as Cleavant Wilson
 Touched by an Angel (1999) as Robert
 Wes Craven's Carnival of Souls (1998) as Sid
 Sliders (1995–2000) as Rembrandt 'Cryin' Man' Brown
 Something Wilder (1994–1995) as Caleb
 Thea  (1993–1994) as Charles
 Woops! (1992) as Frederick Ross
 Drexell's Class (1991–1992) as George Foster
 Good Sports (1991) as Jeff Mussberger
 Sibs (1991)

 L.A. Law (1991) as Mark Wright
 A Different World (1991) as Larry
 Roseanne (1989)
 " Sticks Henderson (1988) 
 Moonlighting (1987) as Leonard Haven
 Spenser: For Hire (1987) as Mac Dickerson
 Bluffing It (1987) as Cal
 Mickey and Nora (1987) as Marvin
 The Equalizer (1986) as Sonny Raines
 Off Beat (1986) as Abe Washington
 Neil Simon's The Slugger's Wife (1985) as Manny Alvarado
 Miami Vice (1985) as David Jones
 Moscow on the Hudson (1984) as Lionel Witherspoon
 The Ambush murders (1982)
 Fort Apache the Bronx (1981) as Suspect No. 4
 When Hell Freezes Over, I'll Skate (1979)
 Cindy (1978) as Michael Simpson

Discography
 Dreamgirls: Original Broadway Cast Album (1982)
 Beginnings (1999)
 Brooklyn'' (2004)

References

External links
 Cleavant Derricks official website
 
 
 
 

1953 births
Living people
African-American male actors
African-American musicians
American male film actors
American male musical theatre actors
American male television actors
Drama Desk Award winners
Identical twin male actors
People from Knoxville, Tennessee
Male actors from Tennessee
Tony Award winners
American twins
20th-century African-American male singers
21st-century African-American people